Coleophora paramayrella is a moth of the family Coleophoridae. It is found in southern Europe.

The length of the forewings is 6.5-7.5 mm for males and 6-6.5 mm for females. Adults are on wing from May to June.

The larvae feed on Trifolium ochroleucon.

References

paramayrella
Moths of Europe
Moths described in 1993